The qualifying round matches of the 1999–2000 UEFA Cup were played on 12 and 26 August 2000. The round consisted of 38 matches.

Seeding

Source:

Summary

|}

Matches

Shakhtar Donetsk won 4–3 on aggregate.

HJK Helsinki won 2–1 on aggregate.

Lokomotivi Tbilisi won 2–1 on aggregate.

1–1 on aggregate. Sigma Olomouc won on away goals.

Hapoel Tel Aviv won 4–1 on aggregate.

Red Star Belgrade won 4–2 on aggregate.

Spartak Trnava won 3–1 on aggregate.

Lokomotiv Moscow won 12–1 on aggregate.

Torpedo Kutaisi won 9–2 on aggregate.

Gorica won 2–1 on aggregate.

Vojvodina won 5–1 on aggregate.

Club Brugge won 5–0 on aggregate.

Omonia won 8–1 on aggregate.

Kryvbas Kryvyi Rih won 5–0 on aggregate.

Grazer AK won 9–0 on aggregate.

Helsingborg won 5–0 on aggregate.

St Johnstone won 3–1 on aggregate.

Inter Bratislava won 5–1 on aggregate.

Bodø/Glimt won 3–1 on aggregate.

Viking won 18–0 on aggregate.

Maccabi Tel Aviv won 4–3 on aggregate.

Steaua București won 7–1 on aggregate.

Lyngby won 7–0 on aggregate.

Ankaragücü won 2–0 on aggregate.

Zürich won 4–0 on aggregate.

Grasshopper won 8–0 on aggregate.

IFK Göteborg won 3–1 on aggregate.

Dinamo București won 13–2 on aggregate.

Legia Warsaw won 9–0 on aggregate.

Levski Sofia won 2–0 on aggregate.

Anderlecht won 9–1 on aggregate.

3–3 on aggregate. Olimpija Ljubljana won on away goals.

Hajduk Split won 6–1 on aggregate.

Celtic won 10–0 on aggregate.

CSKA Sofia won 8–0 on aggregate.

Ferencváros won 4–2 on aggregate.

Kilmarnock won 2–1 on aggregate.

Notes

References

External links
Qualifying Round Information
RSSSF Page

Q